European route E 952 is a European B class road in Greece, connecting the city Preveza – Lamia.

Route 
 
 Preveza
 Vonitsa
 Amfilochia
 Agrinio
 Karpenisi
 E65, E75 Lamia

External links 
 UN Economic Commission for Europe: Overall Map of E-road Network (2007)
 International E-road network

International E-road network
Roads in Greece